Giuseppe Russo (born 27 June 1983) is an Italian footballer who plays as a midfielder. He made his Serie B debut with Crotone in the 2001/2002 season.

References

External links 
 
Hellas Verona F.C. Official Player Profile 

1983 births
Footballers from Catania
Footballers from Sicily
Living people
Italian footballers
Association football midfielders
F.C. Crotone players
A.C.R. Messina players
A.S.D. Paternò 1908 players
Rimini F.C. 1912 players
U.S. Catanzaro 1929 players
F.C. Grosseto S.S.D. players
Cavese 1919 players
A.S.D. Gallipoli Football 1909 players
Hellas Verona F.C. players
Ascoli Calcio 1898 F.C. players
F.C. Lumezzane V.G.Z. A.S.D. players
Ternana Calcio players
Catania S.S.D. players
Serie B players
Serie C players